Presidential elections were held in Ecuador on 14 and 15 December 1933. The result was a victory for José María Velasco Ibarra of the Conservative Party, who received 80% of the vote.

Results

References

Presidential elections in Ecuador
Ecuador
1933 in Ecuador
Election and referendum articles with incomplete results